Dizicheh Rural District is a rural district (dehestan) in the Central District of Mobarakeh County, Isfahan Province, Iran. At the 2006 census, its population was 1,192, in 332 families.  The rural district has 2 villages.

References 

Rural Districts of Isfahan Province
Mobarakeh County